The Scottish National Liberation Army (SNLA), nicknamed the Tartan Terrorists, is a militant group which aims to bring about Scottish independence from the United Kingdom. The SNLA has been condemned by the UK government. The group was reportedly founded by Adam Busby, a former soldier from Paisley after the 1979 devolution referendum, which the organisation claims was fixed.

Activity
In 1983 letter bombs were sent to Diana, Princess of Wales, and to the prime minister, Margaret Thatcher. The device sent to Thatcher was active and was opened by parliamentarian Robert Key: there was no explosion. Busby fled to Dublin in 1983 after the letter-bombing campaign; he was jailed in connection with that campaign in 1997.

In 1993 Andrew McIntosh was jailed for 12 years for conspiring to coerce the government into setting up a separate government in Scotland. The High Court in Aberdeen heard McIntosh had masterminded a campaign of disruption and fear which included placing bombs outside oil industry offices and sending letter bombs to the Scottish Office in Edinburgh. McIntosh served six years and was released in 1999. He died in 2004 after being arrested on firearms charges.

In 2002 Cherie Blair became a target of a renewed campaign by the SNLA when she was sent an anonymous parcel containing a vial that was crudely labelled as containing 'Massage Oil', but which on investigation proved to contain caustic acid. In addition, a renewed letter bomb campaign was waged against Scottish politicians, parcels were recovered after a man claiming to be from the SNLA made an anonymous phone call to the police at London's Scotland Yard. Professor Paul Wilkinson opined at the time: "The SNLA has surfaced from time to time." Meanwhile, in 2006 it was reported that Busby may be targeted for extradition to the United States to face terror charges following a series of e-mails to the country about how to contaminate US water supplies.

In January 2008 two men, Wayne Cook and Steven Robinson were convicted in Manchester of sending miniature bottles of vodka contaminated with caustic soda and threatening to kill English people 'with no hesitation or compunction' by poisoning the country's water supply, echoing a previous threat in 2006. The accompanying letters were signed 'SNLA'. Cook and Robinson were each sentenced to six years for these offences.

In June 2009, Adam Busby Jr., the son of the SNLA founder, was jailed for 6 years for sending a total of 6 packages to various political figures, including First Minister Alex Salmond, Liberal Democrat MSP Mike Rumbles and Glasgow City Council. The packages contained shotgun cartridges and threatening notes. Police linked the crimes to Busby after calls made to journalists claiming SNLA responsibility for the actions were traced to his mobile phone.

In July 2010 Adam Busby Sr. was sentenced by an Irish court to four years in jail after being convicted in June 2010 of making hoax bomb threats against transatlantic flights.

Associated organisations
The Scottish Freedom Party  (SFP) has been described as the political wing of the SNLA. The SFP and John MacLean Society were formed in 1995 by former members and supporters of the SNLA. Both groups want to reverse English immigration into Scotland and promote Scottish Gaelic as the country's national language.

References

External links
 The Story of the SNLA
 The Story of the SNLA paperback – Inactive as of 07/01/2008
 Vodka poisoned in 'Terror Plot' – BBC 7 Jan 2008
 Attacks attributed to the SNLA on the START database

Irregular military
Terrorism in Scotland
Scottish nationalist organisations
1979 establishments in Scotland
Organizations established in 1979
False flag operations
Paramilitary organisations based in the United Kingdom
Scottish republicanism